Dallan Murphy (born 22 July 1988) is an Australian professional rugby union footballer. His regular playing position is fly-half

Murphy won a Queensland Premier Rugby title playing for Brothers in 2009. He played for the Queensland Reds in the Super Rugby competition in 2011 and 2012. He made his debut for the Reds during the 2011 Super Rugby season against the Chiefs in Hamilton.

He joined English club Rotherham Titans in 2013.

Reference list

External links 
 

Australian rugby union players
Australian expatriate rugby union players
Queensland Reds players
Rugby union fly-halves
1988 births
Rugby union players from Brisbane
Living people
Expatriate rugby union players in France
Expatriate rugby union players in England
Expatriate rugby union players in Japan
Australian expatriate sportspeople in France
Australian expatriate sportspeople in England
Australian expatriate sportspeople in Japan
Rotherham Titans players
Yokohama Canon Eagles players
Melbourne Rebels players